Winiary may refer to the following:

Settlements

Neighbourhoods
, former villages around the Winogrady neighbourhood, currently a neighbourhood in the Jeżyce district of Poznań
, a neighbourhood in Gniezno
, a neighbourhood in Płock
, a neighbourhood in Kalisz
, a neighbourhood in Głogówek
Winiary, Warka, a suburb of Warka in Masovian Voivodeship

Town's and villages
Winiary, Proszowice County in Lesser Poland Voivodeship (south Poland)
 in Greater Poland Voivodeship (west-central Poland)
Winiary, Wieliczka County in Lesser Poland Voivodeship (south Poland)
Winiary, Pińczów County in Świętokrzyskie Voivodeship (south-central Poland)
Winiary, Sandomierz County in Świętokrzyskie Voivodeship (south-central Poland)

Buildings
Fort Winiary, a former fort around Poznań

Business
Winiary (company), a Polish food processing company

Sports
Winiary Kalisz, former name of a professional women's volleyball team